The Bourgeois Nunataks are a group of nunataks  southwest of Governor Mountain in the Wilson Hills. They were mapped by the United States Geological Survey from surveys and from U.S. Navy air photos, 1960–63, and named by the Advisory Committee on Antarctic Names for William L. Bourgeois, Chief Aviation Machinist's Mate, U.S. Navy, a flight engineer on LC-130 Hercules aircraft during Operation Deep Freeze 1967 and 1968.

References 

Nunataks of Oates Land